Statistics of Empress's Cup in the 1997 season.

Overview
It was contested by 20 teams, and Yomiuri-Seiyu Beleza won the championship.

Results

1st round
Kochi JFC Rosa 0-7 Shiroki FC Serena
Mothers Kumamoto Rainbow 1-0 YKK Tohoku LSC Flappers
Matsushita Electric Panasonic Ragazza 4-1 Sapporo Linda
Takarazuka Bunnys 4-1 Nippon Sport Science University

2nd round
Nawashiro Ladies 0-4 OKI FC Winds
Tasaki Perule FC 9-0 AS Elfen FC
Shimizudaihachi SC 0-6 Fujita SC Mercury
Matsushita Electric Panasonic Bambina 13-0 Scramble FC
Yomiuri-Seiyu Beleza 4-1 Shiroki FC Serena
Mothers Kumamoto Rainbow 0-5 Suzuyo Shimizu FC Lovely Ladies
Nikko Securities Dream Ladies 10-0 Matsushita Electric Panasonic Ragazza
Takarazuka Bunnys 1-2 Prima Ham FC Kunoichi

Quarterfinals
Yomiuri-Seiyu Beleza 2-0 OKI FC Winds
Tasaki Perule FC 0-3 Suzuyo Shimizu FC Lovely Ladies
Nikko Securities Dream Ladies 3-0 Fujita SC Mercury
Matsushita Electric Panasonic Bambina 1-5 Prima Ham FC Kunoichi

Semifinals
Yomiuri-Seiyu Beleza 3-0 Suzuyo Shimizu FC Lovely Ladies
Nikko Securities Dream Ladies 2-2 (pen 2-4) Prima Ham FC Kunoichi

Final
Yomiuri-Seiyu Beleza 1-0 Prima Ham FC Kunoichi
Yomiuri-Seiyu Beleza won the championship.

References

Empress's Cup
1997 in Japanese women's football